= Pure Hockey =

American hockey equipment retailer

Pure Hockey is a retailer of hockey equipment in the United States. Founded in 1994, it began as a single location in Worcester, Massachusetts, it expanded to additional locations in 2002, and as of May 2026 operates over 100 stores in 32 states and the District of Columbia. Acquisition of other hockey retailers has allowed it to expand. It is now the largest retailer in its category in the U.S., and as of 2022 partners with the Learn to Play Program of the National Hockey League (NHL) and NHL Players' Association. It is also an official partner of USA Hockey.
